Astounded may refer to:

 "Astounded" (Bran Van 3000 song), 2001
 "Astounded" (Tantric song), 2001